The Fantastic Magic Baby (紅孩兒) is a 1975 film directed by Chang Cheh. The film is based on selected chapters of Wu Cheng'en's classical 16th century novel Journey to the West focusing on the story of Red Boy.

Main cast

Ting Wa Chung as Red Boy
Lau Chung-Chun as Sun Wukong
Tang Gok-Yan as Tang Priest Tripitaka
Chen I-Ho as Zhu Bajie
Yeung Fui-Yuk as Sha Wujing
Chiang Tao as Bull Demon King
Woo Gam as Princess Iron Fan
Fung Hak-On as Erlang Shen
Chao Li-Chuan as Guan Yin
Tsai Hung as Juling Shen

References

External links

A review. Archived

1975 films
Hong Kong musical films
Films based on Journey to the West

Films directed by Chang Cheh
1970s Hong Kong films
Hong Kong fantasy films